Göçük is a village in Tarsus district of Mersin Province, Turkey. It is situated in the peneplane area to the south of the Taurus Mountains and to the north of Berdan Resorvoir. The population of the village was 271 as of 2012. The main crop of the village is grapes.

References

Villages in Tarsus District